Hillsdale County is a county located in the U.S. state of Michigan. As of the 2020 Census, the population was 45,746.  The county seat is Hillsdale.

Hillsdale County is the only county in Michigan to border both Indiana and Ohio.  Due to an angle in the state's southern border, Hillsdale County has the southernmost point in the state.  Hillsdale County is conterminous with the Hillsdale, MI Micropolitan Statistical Area.

The Hillsdale County Courthouse was designed by Claire Allen, a prominent southern Michigan architect.

History
The county is named for its rolling terrain. It was described by action of the Michigan Territorial legislature in 1829, and was organized six years later. See List of Michigan county name etymologies.

Hillsdale County was a New England settlement; its early settlers came from the northern coastal colonies – "Yankees", descended from the English Puritans who emigrated from the Old World in the 1600s.  There was a wave of such settlers into the Northwest Territory during the early 1800s, many traveling on the newly completed Erie Canal, and made safe by the conclusion of the Black Hawk War. They brought with them a passion for education, establishing many schools. Many were abolitionists.

Geography
Hillsdale is the only county in Michigan to have a land border with two other states – Ohio and Indiana. The headwaters of two St. Joseph Rivers rise in Hillsdale County: the St. Joseph River (Lake Michigan) and the St. Joseph River (Maumee River).

Parks
 McCourtie Park
 Slayton Arboretum

Adjacent counties

 Jackson County  (northeast)
 Calhoun County  (northwest)
 Lenawee County  (east)
 Branch County  (west)
 Fulton County, Ohio  (southeast)
 Williams County, Ohio  (south)
 Steuben County, Indiana  (southwest)

Climate
Hillsdale County experiences four distinct seasons.

Demographics

As of the 2000 United States Census, there were 46,527 people, 17,335 households, and 12,550 families residing in the county. The population density was 78 people per square mile (30/km2). There were 20,189 housing units at an average density of 34 per square mile (13/km2). The racial makeup of the county was 97.56% White, 0.43% Black or African American, 0.35% Native American, 0.33% Asian, 0.01% Pacific Islander, 0.34% from other races, and 0.98% from two or more races. 1.20% of the population were Hispanic or Latino of any race. 28.4% were of German, 28.2% English and 9.3% Irish ancestry, 97.0% spoke English, 1.2% Spanish and 1.2% German as their first language.

There were 17,335 households, out of which 32.90% had children under the age of 18 living with them, 59.90% were married couples living together, 8.40% had a female householder with no husband present, and 27.60% were non-families. 22.90% of all households were made up of individuals, and 9.30% had someone living alone who was 65 years of age or older. The average household size was 2.60 and the average family size was 3.05.

The county's population contained 26.30% under the age of 18, 10.00% from 18 to 24, 26.80% from 25 to 44, 23.50% from 45 to 64, and 13.30% who were 65 years of age or older. The median age was 36 years. For every 100 females there were 99.00 males. For every 100 females age 18 and over, there were 96.20 males.

The median income for a household in the county was $40,396, and the median income for a family was $45,895. Males had a median income of $35,349 versus $23,718 for females. The per capita income for the county was $18,255. About 5.20% of families and 8.20% of the population were below the poverty line, including 8.80% of those under age 18 and 8.60% of those age 65 or over.

Government
Hillsdale County has been a reliably Republican county since the 19th century. Since 1884, the Republican nominee has carried the county in 32 of 34 presidential elections, the lone exceptions being when it was carried by Democrat Lyndon B. Johnson amidst a national landslide in 1964, and when it was carried by Progressive nominee Theodore Roosevelt when the Republican electorate had a schism in 1912. 

The county government operates the county jail, maintains rural roads, operates the major local courts, records deeds, mortgages, and vital records, administers public health regulations, and participates with the state in the provision of social services. The county board of commissioners controls the budget and has limited authority to make laws or ordinances. In Michigan, most local government functions — police and fire, building and zoning, tax assessment, street maintenance, etc. — are the responsibility of individual cities and townships.

Elected officials

 Circuit Court Judge: Honorable Sara S. Lisznyai
 District Court Judge: Honorable Megan Stiverson
 Probate Judge: Honorable Michelle A. Bianchi
 Prosecuting Attorney: Neal A. Brady
 Sheriff: Scott B. Hodshire
 County Clerk: Marney Kast
 County Treasurer: Stephenie Kyser
 Register of Deeds: Bambi L. Somerlott
 Drain Commissioner: Matt Word
 Board of Commissioners:
 District One: Ruth Brown
 District Two: Andy Weldon, Vice Chairperson
 District Three: Mark E. Wiley, Chairperson
 District Four: Bruce Caswell
 District Five: John Burtka

Republican Party Split

On August 12th, 2022 the Hillsdale County Republican Party refused to let duly elected precinct delegates from entering the County Convention. This was under the claim that Hillsdale County Clerk, Marney Kast, had purposely spoiled certain candidates ballots past the filing deadline. They held the convention with those who were not disavowed inside the Sozo Church. The duly elected precinct delegates held there own convention outside in the parking lot. The party split, and multiple lawsuits followed.

Currently, the Michigan Republican Party recognizes Brent Leininger as the Chair of the Hillsdale County Republican Party, who was one of the precinct delegates previously disavowed.

Transportation

Major highways
  crosses the county in a generally east–west direction for a distance of about 23 miles. US 12 is the southernmost US Highway in Michigan to go east and west.
  is the north–south highway running along a portion of the eastern boundary of the county and is also called Meridian Road as it runs along the Michigan meridian.
  is a highway from the eastern border of the county westward until it joins M-99. It is also known as Hudson Road.
  is a north–south highway running north from the Ohio border and intersects M-99 in the northwest corner of the county.
  crosses the county in a generally north–south direction for a distance of about 30 miles. It is also known as Carleton Road (named after the poet Will Carleton who attended Hillsdale College and lived in Hillsdale for a time.)

Airports
Hillsdale Municipal Airport (KJYM) established in 1963, has a 5000' paved and lighted runway with instrument approaches, hangars, tie-downs, and fuel services available. It allows general aviation access to Hillsdale County and nearby areas.

Trails
The 4000 mile National Scenic North Country Trail passes through the county in a north–south direction.

Communities

Cities
 Hillsdale (county seat)
 Jonesville
 Litchfield
 Reading

Villages
 Allen
 Camden
 Montgomery
 North Adams
 Waldron

Civil townships

 Adams Township
 Allen Township
 Amboy Township
 Cambria Township
 Camden Township
 Fayette Township
 Hillsdale Township
 Jefferson Township
 Litchfield Township
 Moscow Township
 Pittsford Township
 Ransom Township
 Reading Township
 Scipio Township
 Somerset Township
 Wheatland Township
 Woodbridge Township
 Wright Township

Unincorporated communities

 Amboy Center
 Austin
 Bankers
 Betzer
 Cambria
 Church's Corners
 Frontier
 Jerome
 Lake LeAnn
 Locust Corners
 Moscow
 Mosherville
 Osseo
 Pittsford
 Prattville
 Ransom
 Somerset
 Somerset Center

Notable people
 Moses Allen, first settler and veteran of the War of 1812.
 Oscar F. Avery (1841–1924), lawyer and Illinois state senator, was born in Allen Township.
 Don A. Jones (1912–2000), admiral and civil engineer, seventh Director of the United States Coast and Geodetic Survey and second Director of the Environmental Science Services Administration Corps, born in Waldron.
 Penny Neer, Olympic athlete.

See also
 Bawbeese
 National Register of Historic Places listings in Hillsdale County, Michigan
 List of Michigan State Historic Sites in Hillsdale County, Michigan

References

Further reading

External links

 Hillsdale County government
 

 
Michigan counties
1835 establishments in Michigan Territory
Populated places established in 1835